Jurkiewicz is a Polish surname, which is derived from the given name Jurek, a form of the Greek name Georgios. The name may refer to:

Anna Jurkiewicz (born 1984), Polish figure skater
Edward Jurkiewicz (born 1948), Polish basketball player
Mariusz Jurkiewicz (born 1982), Polish handball player
Wojciech Jurkiewicz (born 1977), Polish volleyball player

References

Polish-language surnames
Patronymic surnames
Surnames from given names